The Gemini Nunataks are two nunataks of similar size and appearance in a prominent position near the west wall of Shackleton Glacier, Antarctica, just southeast of Mount Cole. They were named by F. Alton Wade, leader of the Texas Tech Shackleton Glacier Expedition, 1962–63, after the constellation Gemini, which contains the twin stars Castor and Pollux.

References

Nunataks of the Ross Dependency
Dufek Coast